The current flag of Prince George's County, Maryland, was adopted in 1963, replacing one that had been in use since 1696. It is a 3 parts tall by 5 parts wide white field with a red St. George's cross centered atop it, with the seal of Prince George's County defacing the canton. Though official regulation states that the flag use the former county seal that was used from 1958 to 1971, in practice most flags that are manufactured and used by the county government itself use the current county seal, which was introduced in 1971.

History

The flag's origins date back to 1696, when Prince George's County was first created and under English rule. The flag was used by horsemen and colonial foot soldiers and consisted of a red St. George's Cross on a white field. The red cross of St. George was a symbol of Christian martyrdom since its first use during the Crusades.

Modifications
In 1963, the Prince George's County seal, the current one at the time, designed in November 1958, was added into the flag's canton to distinguish it from other flags.

Design
The flag is a three-by-five white field with a red cross centered atop it, with the county seal in the canton.

Specification
The flag as defined by the most recent iteration of the Prince George's County code is stipulated to utilize the 1958-specification county seal, which was replaced in 1971. However, most flags actually manufactured and used by the county government itself do not follow the county code's definition and rather utilize the current county seal, introduced in 1971. The differences between the 1958 seal and the 1971 one are that the former lacks an apostrophe in "George's" and uses a letter "V" instead of a letter "U". Both seals include a shield reflecting the Stuart royal arms used by Queen Anne (rather than those of the Danish Prince George) when she was Queen of England between 1703 and 1707; when Scotland and England united as the Kingdom of Great Britain in 1707, the arms Anne bore to reflect the union changed, but Prince George's County retained the older design.

See also

Flag of Maryland
Flag of Washington, D.C.
Flag of Montgomery County, Maryland
Prince George's County, Maryland

References

External links

Prince George's County, Maryland
Prince George's County, Maryland
Prince Georges County, Maryland
Flags displaying animals